is a Japanese actress, voice actress, and dancer from Tokyo, Japan. She is best known for her performances as Kayako Saeki in the Ju-On and Grudge franchises.

Biography
A native of Tokyo, Fuji studied acting at the Aoyama Gakuin University, and subsequently joined the Ein Theatrical Company. Her work was usually on-stage or in voice-over studios, but occasionally she would also appear in films. Her most famous role to this date is that of Kayako Saeki, the vengeful ghost in the Ju-on series, which she subsequently played in The Grudge series later on as well. She first played Kayako in the 1998 short movie Katasumi, part of the Gakkô no kaidan G collection. She then reprised her role in the direct-to-video film Ju-on and its sequel, Ju-on 2.

When director Takashi Shimizu decided to direct two additional instalments for a broader theatrical release, which he called (Ju-on: The Grudge and Ju-on: The Grudge 2), Fuji played the character of Kayako twice more. When the films were subsequently remade for an American audience as The Grudge and The Grudge 2, she returned as Kayako again. However, she declined the role in The Grudge 3 which subsequently went to Aiko Horiuchi.

Filmography

Films

Anime

Dubbing

References

External links
 Official agency profile 
 
 
 

1972 births
Living people
Japanese film actresses
Japanese video game actresses
Japanese voice actresses
Voice actresses from Tokyo
20th-century Japanese actresses
21st-century Japanese actresses